This is a list of the states and union territories of India ranked in order of number of children born for each woman. 

Recent surveys show that in majority of Indian states, fertility rate has fallen well below the replacement level of 2.1 and the country is fast approaching the replacement level itself. The total fertility rate of India in 2017 stood at 2.2. Due to the large population, poverty and strain on resources, the Indian government initiated population control efforts to decrease birth rate with the current target being at 2.1 children per woman. According to data from National Family Health Survey-5, India's total fertility rate dropped below the replacement level of 2.1, and currently stands at 2.0.

List

Total Fertility rate yearwise 

Country comparisons use data from the Population Reference Bureau.

Visualisation
Google Chart TFR vs Area vs Population

Notes

See also
 Demographics of India

Demographics of India
Indian states
India